Rodrigo Prieto Stambaugh, ASC, AMC (born November 23, 1965), is a Mexican cinematographer. He has collaborated with Martin Scorsese and Alejandro González Iñárritu, among other prominent directors. He is a member of both the Mexican Society of Cinematographers and the American Society of Cinematographers. Throughout his career, Prieto has received many awards and nominations, including three Academy Award nominations for Best Cinematography in Ang Lee's Brokeback Mountain (2005), Martin Scorsese's Silence (2016), and The Irishman (2019).

Life and career
Rodrigo Prieto was born in Mexico City, Mexico. His grandfather, Jorge Prieto Laurens, was the mayor of Mexico City and leader of the Chamber of Deputies of Mexico, but was later persecuted by the country's ruler because of political differences. Prieto's grandfather escaped with his family to Texas and then to Los Angeles, where Prieto's father would spend most of his childhood. Prieto's father studied aeronautical engineering at New York University, where he met and married Prieto's mother, an artist.
Rodrigo Prieto graduated from Centro de Capacitación Cinematográfica in Mexico City, where Prieto had become an established cinematographer, working with such names as Spike Lee (25th Hour), Curtis Hanson (8 Mile), Ang Lee (Brokeback Mountain and Lust, Caution) and Pedro Almodóvar (Broken Embraces). Nonetheless, his political legacy still had a visible effect on his career. In 2002, Prieto shot Frida, a film about Frida Kahlo, a Communist Mexican artist. In 2003, Prieto cooperated with Oliver Stone in two documentary projects: Comandante, about Fidel Castro, and Persona Non Grata, about Yasser Arafat. In 2004, Prieto shot Alexander for Stone. Prieto also worked with Alejandro González Iñárritu on the acclaimed Amores perros, 21 Grams, Babel and Biutiful.

Prieto is noted for his unconventional use of the camera often combined with strong moody lighting. In 25th Hour, Prieto utilized overexposure and other techniques to create original dream-like images to signify that the events shown on screen are memories or visions. Similarly innovative photography could be spotted in Frida, featuring strong colors and sharp imagery blended with atmospheric yellows and browns, as well as his experimental use of infrared during a battle scene in Alexander. Prieto also is interested in evoking naturalism, most evident in The Homesman and Brokeback Mountain. Prieto not only shot Brokeback Mountain, for which he was nominated for an Academy Award for Best Cinematography, but appeared in a cameo role within the film as a Mexican gigolo whom Jake Gyllenhaal's character, Jack Twist, meets.

Prieto has formed an artistic collaboration with Martin Scorsese; first on The Wolf of Wall Street, Silence, for which he garnered his second Academy Award nomination for Best Cinematography, and most recently The Irishman, released in November 2019. In December 2019, Prieto announced he would be involved with Scorsese's upcoming film Killers of the Flower Moon. He served as cinematographer for the music videos for the three Taylor Swift 2020 singles, "The Man", which references one of his previous films, The Wolf of Wall Street, "Cardigan" and "Willow".

Prieto is the recipient of the 2021 Vilcek Prize in Filmmaking, awarded by the Vilcek Foundation.

Personal life
Prieto resides in Los Angeles, California with his wife Monica and they have two daughters: Maria Fernanda and Ximena.

Filmography

Awards and nominations

Academy Awards

BAFTA Awards

American Society of Cinematographers Awards

Other awards
Ariel Awards

Circuit Community Awards

Boston Society of Film Critics

Critics' Choice Awards

Camerimage

Chicago Film Critics Association

Chlotrudis Awards

Cinema Writers Circle Awards, Spain

CinEuphoria Awards

Dallas–Fort Worth Film Critics Association

Dublin Film Critics' Circle

Independent Spirit Awards

Florida Film Critics Circle

Georgia Film Critics Association

Golden Horse Film Festival and Awards

Goya Awards

Houston Film Critics Society

International Cinematographers' Film Festival Manaki Brothers

International Cinephile Society Awards

International Online Cinema Awards (INOCA)

Latino Entertainment Journalists Association Film Awards

National Society of Film Critics

North Texas Film Critics Association

Online Film & Television Association

Online Film Critics Society Award

Phoenix Critics Circle

Phoenix Film Critics Society Awards

San Diego Film Critics Society

San Francisco Bay Area Film Critics Circle

San Sebastián International Film Festival

Satellite Awards

St. Louis Film Critics Association

Tribeca Film Festival

Venice Film Festival

Vilcek Prize in Filmmaking

Washington D.C. Area Film Critics Association

See also
 Cinema of Mexico

References

External links
 Interview with Prieto
 

1965 births
Mexican emigrants to the United States
Best Cinematography Ariel Award winners
Living people
Mexican cinematographers
People from Mexico City